Asa Tarbell Newhall (1846-1937) was a Massachusetts politician who served in both branches of the Massachusetts legislature, and as the 23rd  Mayor of Lynn, Massachusetts.  Newhall also served in both branches of the Lynn city council and on the city's school committee.

Massachusetts House of Representatives

1903 State Representative election
In 1903 Newhall was elected as a Democrat to serve in the Massachusetts House of Representatives of 1904.   In the 1903 election Newhall received 1,371 votes coming in second behind Republican candidate John W. Blaney who received 1,434 votes, and just ahead of fellow Democrat Michael F. Phelan who received 1,307 votes.  The district Newhall ran in sent two representatives to the Massachusetts House, so although Newhall came in second in the vote total he was elected.   While in the House of 1904 Newhall served on the Committee on Prisons.

1904 State Representative electoral defeat
In 1904 Newhall was defeated in his bid for reelection.  Newhall placed third in the balloting behind Republican Arthur W. Barker and fellow Democratic party candidate Michael F. Phelan.

He died in 1937.

Notes

1846 births
1937 deaths
Mayors of Lynn, Massachusetts
Members of the Massachusetts House of Representatives
Massachusetts state senators
Massachusetts city council members